Griposia is a genus of moths of the family Noctuidae.

Species in Europa
Griposia aprilina
Griposia pinkeri
Griposia skyvai
Griposia wegneri

References

Natural History Museum Lepidoptera genus database

Cuculliinae